David "Bomber" Pearce (8 May 1959 – 20 May 2000) was a Welsh heavyweight boxing champion.

Also known as The Welsh Rocky, Pearce held both the Welsh and the British heavyweight titles and held the number one WBC cruiserweight ranking from September 1983 to September 1985. In all he won 19 (15 KO) of his 24 bouts, losing three, with one drawn. He won two of his unlicensed bouts, losing one.

Biographical details
Pearce was born in Newport, Monmouthshire on 8 May 1959. He was one of nine children: seven brothers, six of whom boxed professionally and one who was a professional dancer, and two sisters. His mother was a relative of Bob Fitzsimmons.

He boxed out of St Josephs ABC in Newport and coached junior and senior boxers at Alway ABC in Newport before his death.

Soon after his final unsanctioned boxing fight in 1994, in California, Pearce became seriously ill, in later years developing epilepsy. There was no specific evidence that this had been brought on by repeated blows to the head, but he immediately retired from boxing on medical advice. He died 7 years later, at the age of 41, due to SADS (sudden adult death syndrome). The South Wales Argus described him as "Newport's most famous boxer." Around 2,500 people attended his funeral in Newport at Stow Hill Cemetery.

Boxing career achievements

 Pearce won the Welsh and British heavyweight boxing titles in September 1983.
 Pearce challenged for the prestigious EBU European heavyweight title against Felipe Rodriguez and Lucien Rodriguez.
 Pearce was ranked as high as number seven in the WBA heavyweight world rankings before his career was cut short.
 Pearce was ranked number one in the WBC cruiserweight rankings after his victory against Michael "Jack" Johnson, in a WBC final eliminator in 1984.
 Pearce was scheduled to fight Buster Douglas in Columbus, Ohio, USA but was pulled out on three hours' notice. Donnie Long replaced Pearce.
 Pearce was medically retired in 1984, at the age of 24.
 Pearce came 2nd in the BBC Wales Sports Personality of the Year in 1983.

 Steve Lillis, boxing journalist and co-presenter of Box-Nation, voted David 'Bomber' Pearce in his top ten most underrated British boxing champions (Lonsdale Belt Holders) of all time.

Welsh & British heavyweight titles
 Pearce suffered two setbacks on his road to the British title. A loss to Neville Meade when still only 20 and to John Rafferty. Pearce had knocked down Rafferty four times before he was disqualified in the 3rd round for punching after the referee had called break.
 Pearce fought in a scheduled WBC eliminator and defeated Dennis Andries, the three times WBC world light heavyweight world champion, in the 7th round. Dennis Andries went six years before being stopped again, this time by Thomas Hearns in the 10th round.
 Pearce, challenged and vowed to avenge his loss to Neville Meade to win the Welsh and British heavyweight titles.
 Pearce won the Welsh and British heavyweight boxing titles in September 1983 at the St David's Hall against Commonwealth gold medallist and British heavyweight champion Neville Meade. Although the Welsh title was won on the night, the title had to be relinquished by Pearce, due to his commitments of becoming British heavyweight champion.

European Heavyweight Title (EBU)
 David Pearce earned a draw with Felipe Rodriquez whilst fighting the EBU heavyweight title challenger. 
 Pearce lost his title fight for the European Heavyweight Title against Lucien Rodriguez who had won 14 of his last 15 fights after earning the number one EBU ranking.

Unsanctioned bouts

Pearce won two (both knockouts) of his three unlicensed bouts. Pearce took a fight with Percell Davis of Detroit at two days' notice but was stopped in the eighth round.

Pearce later had a second wind after sparring against Lennox Lewis who was in preparation for the Lewis–Glenn McCrory fight and decided to train once more for his final comeback in California, USA. Pearce wanted to go out on a high after his unprepared previous trip to the states and trained diligently with his brother Gary Pearce.
 
In 1994 Pearce fought in two unsanctioned bouts that took place in Bakersfield, California. In his first bout he knocked out Mary Konate in the first round and in his second he defeated the former heavyweight world champion John Tate in three rounds. The South Wales Argus and the Californian press likened Pearce to the fighter Philo Beddoe, who was portrayed in the films Every Which Way but Loose and Any Which Way You Can.

Professional boxing record / Unsanctioned bouts

|-
| style="text-align:center;" colspan="8"|19 Wins (15 knockouts, 4 decisions), 4 Losses (2 knockouts, 2 decisions), 1 Draw
|-  style="text-align:center; background:#e3e3e3;"
|  style="border-style:none none solid solid; "|Result
|  style="border-style:none none solid solid; "|Record
|  style="border-style:none none solid solid; "|Opponent
|  style="border-style:none none solid solid; "|Type
|  style="border-style:none none solid solid; "|Round
|  style="border-style:none none solid solid; "|Date
|  style="border-style:none none solid solid; "|Location
|  style="border-style:none none solid solid; "|Notes
|- align=center
|Win
|
|align=left| John Tate
|TKO
|3
|10 June 1994
|align=left| Hilton Hotel, Bakersfield, California, United States
|align=left|Unsanctioned Bout
|-
|Win
|
|align=left| Mary Konate
|TKO
|1
|12 April 1994
|align=left| Hilton Hotel, Bakersfield, California, United States
|align=left|Unsanctioned Bout
|-
|Loss
|
|align=left| Percell Davis
|TKO
|8
|10 December 1990
|align=left| Hyatt Regency Hotel, Dearborn, Michigan, United States
|align=left|Unsanctioned Bout 

|-
|Loss
|
|align=left| Lucien Rodriguez
|PTS
|12
|30 March 1984
|align=left| Palais des Sports de Beaublanc, Limoges, Haute-Vienne, France
|align=left|EBU Heavyweight Title. 

|-
|Win
|
|align=left| Michael Johnson
|TKO
|5
|28 January 1984
|align=left| Victoria Hall, Hanley, Staffordshire, United Kingdom
|align=left|
|-
|Win
|
|align=left| Neville Meade
|TKO
|9
|22 September 1983
|align=left| St David's Hall, Cardiff, Wales, United Kingdom
|align=left|BBBofC Wales Heavyweight Title.
BBBofC British Heavyweight Title.

|-
|Win
|
|align=left| Albert Syben
|KO
|1
|7 April 1983
|align=left| Lyceum Ballroom, The Strand, London, United Kingdom
|align=left|
|-
|Draw
|
|align=left| Felipe Rodriquez 
|PTS
|10
|7 December 1982
|align=left| Royal Albert Hall, Kensington, London, United Kingdom
|align=left|Vacant EBU Heavyweight Title.

|-
|Win
|
|align=left| Gordon Ferris
|KO
|5
|1 June 1982
|align=left| Royal Albert Hall, Kensington, London, United Kingdom
|align=left|BBBofC British Heavyweight Title Eliminator. Final Eliminator for BBBofC British Heavyweight Title; Ferris down in round 3 and stopped in round 5 failed to meet the count at 1:44 of the fifth round.
|-
|Win
|
|align=left| Dennis Andries
|TKO
|7
|12 October 1981
|align=left| Bloomsbury Centre Hotel, Bloomsbury, London, United Kingdom
|align=left|
|-
|Win
|
|align=left| Ishaq Hussein
|TKO
|1
|8 June 1981
|align=left| Porter Tun Rooms, Moorgate, United Kingdom
|align=left|
|-
|Win
|
|align=left| Larry McDonald
|KO
|3
|16 March 1981
|align=left| National Sporting Club, Piccadilly, London, United Kingdom
|align=left|
|-
|Win
|
|align=left| Bonny McKenzie
|PTS
|8
|2 March 1981
|align=left| National Sporting Club, Piccadilly, London, United Kingdom
|align=left|
|-
|loss
|
|align=left| John Rafferty
|DQ
|3
|26 January 1981
|align=left| St. Andrew's Sporting Club, Glasgow, Scotland, United Kingdom
|align=left|
|-
|Loss
|
|align=left| Neville Meade
|TKO
|2
|22 January 1980
|align=left| Double Diamond Club, Caerphilly, United Kingdom
|align=left|BBBofC Wales Heavyweight Title.

|-
|Win
|
|align=left| Denton Ruddock
|TKO
|7
|30 October 1979
|align=left| Double Diamond Club, Caerphilly, United Kingdom
|align=left|
|-
|Win
|
|align=left| Theo Josephs
|TKO
|3
|5 July 1979
|align=left| Afan Lido, Port Talbot, United Kingdom
|align=left|
|-
|Win
|
|align=left| Winston Allen
|PTS
|6
|3 April 1979
|align=left| Caerphilly, United Kingdom
|align=left| 

|-
|Win
|
|align=left| Bonny McKenzie
|PTS
|8
|19 February 1979
|align=left| Mayfair Sporting Club, Mayfair, London, United Kingdom
|align=left|McKenzie down in sixth and seventh. 
|-
|Win
|
|align=left| Mal Tetley
|KO
|1
|22 January 1979
|align=left| Mayfair, London, United Kingdom
|align=left|

|-
|Win
|
|align=left| Bobby Hennessey
|TKO
|2
|22 January 1979
|align=left| Mayfair, London, United Kingdom
|align=left|
|-
|Win
|
|align=left| Theo Josephs
|PTS
|8
|11 December 1978
|align=left| Plymouth, Devon, United Kingdom
|align=left|
|-
|Win
|
|align=left| Bob Bleau
|KO
|1
|1 December 1978
|align=left| Minster-in-Thanet, United Kingdom
|align=left|
|-
|Win
|
|align=left| Osborne Taylor
|TKO
|1
|15 November 1978
|align=left| Merthyr Tydfil, Wales, United Kingdom
|align=left|

|}

Pearce Brothers
 Walter 'Bimbo' Pearce the eldest son of Wally Pearce was a professional boxer, Bimbo won 5 amateur titles from Light Welterweight to Heavyweight including beating 4 British champions in bouts during the ABA exile.  
 Raymond Pearce, a middleweight who notably fought Winston Burnett, and the future three times WBC world Light Heavyweight champion Dennis Andries. A United States citizen, he worked as an Elvis impersonator across the world and died, on the 1 January 2022, in Minnesota, United States.
 Gary Pearce had thirty-one professional bouts, including winning the Welsh Area Super Welterweight title and facing Hans Henrick-Palm the World number 5 in Randers, Denmark in 1981.
 Ronald Pearce fought Paul Wetter and Robert Smith the now BBBoC General secretary.
 Nigel Pearce had five fights as a professional boxer.
 Simon Pearce the seventh brother graduated from Italia Conti Academy of Theatre Arts and subsequently went on to star in Starlight Express, Cats, les miserables and Mousetrap musicals in the West End.

Gallery

References

External links
 

1959 births
2000 deaths
Welsh male boxers
Sportspeople from Newport, Wales
Heavyweight boxers